A Mary and Martha Society is a volunteer group associated with various Christian churches, each group being independent of the others. Even when the group appears in a hierarchical organization, for example the Roman Catholic Church, the group is only serving that particular church, not with the larger organization. It is known under different names such as the Society of Mary and Martha, The Daughters (and Sons) of Mary and Martha, Saints Martha and Mary Altar Society, MOMS, and marthas (sic).

Biblical references
The name comes from the Christian Bible references to Mary and Martha.  The prevalent reference is Luke the Evangelist Luke10:39-42.  In this passage, Christ and his followers were invited to Martha’s home for a meal.  While Martha busied herself preparing the meal, Mary sat with Christ and the others.  Martha was agitated because Mary was not helping prepare the meal.  She asked Christ if He did not care.  Christ gently reminded her that the meal was not the important task, but the hearing of His Word was the "one thing needful."  Mary and Martha also appear in the gospel of John the Apostle John, Jn11:1-44 and Jn12:2-8.

Service
The society provides various services.  As a Martha the society provides, relief to the poor, hospitality after service, creation of orphanages, provide for missionary services, schools, hospitals, burial for indigents, fund raising, cookbook writing and sales, and maintenance of church buildings.  As a Mary the society provides, Christian education and personal spiritual growth.  One member explains in her letter on behalf of Brook Highland Community Church,"… we chose the name "Mary and Martha Society" because we felt that it identified us with both internal and external service projects, which was our primary mission."  The constitution for the Mary and Martha Society of SS. Peter and Paul Church of Waterloo, Illinois states that their primary interest is their bond of friendship between the ladies of the congregation and the financial assistance of the parochial school.

Chronology
The earliest mention of the society is in 1836 where the Roman Catholic Sisters of Charity took control of the Society in four churches of Saint Peter, Saint Joseph, Saint Aloysius and Saints Peter and Paul.  Their records indicate that the founding of the Society goes back to 1836 with the Sisters of Santa Maria.
In 1877, Saint Mary’s African Methodist Episcopal "AME" church notes that North Carolina Negroes were members of the society.  In 1880, The Sons and Daughters of Mary and Martha were prevalent in Upson County, Georgia.
References in obituaries and burial markers shows the society spread from North Carolina to Canada from 1845 to 1972  Internet references note the denominations to be Roman Catholic, Russian Orthodox, Church of Christ, Congregational, AME, Evangelical and Reformed, Christian Reformed, Lutheran, Episcopal, Community and American Baptist.

In 1986, a book, The Fat Pigeon Files, published by a Christian retreat house in Devon England humorously notes the effect of the Mary and Martha Society on the life of a parish minister.  The Mary and Martha Society continues into the Twenty-first Century with active groups from Bay City Michigan to Albuquerque New Mexico and from Birmingham Alabama to Vancouver Canada.

Notes
The Benedictine Sisters has a large network of volunteer groups named MOMS.  Correspondence with a principal author of the materials for the group suggests no relationship with the Mary and Martha Society.
Inquiries to the Canadian and English groups provided no further information.
The marthas (sic) are named this way as an act of humility after the fashion of e. e. cummings.

Miscellany

Anderson, M. C., Journal of Women's History Volume 12, Number 1, Spring 2000 E- Print   Catholic Nuns and the Invention of Social Work: The Sisters of the Santa Maria Institute of Cincinnati, Ohio, 1897 through the 1920s pp. 60–88 "The activities of the Mary and Martha Society founded in 1836 had been taken over by laymen in parish Saint Vincent de Paul societies."

Bay City in Bloom 2008 Members of MOMS (Mary and Martha Society) from Mount Olive Evangelical Lutheran Church 602 Sidney Street Bay City Michigan formed a committee and planted the area, removing tired old bushes to add a punch of color at the corner of Sidney and State St.

Bethel Lutheran Church, Bethel, Oregon From the church bulletin "On November 12, 1950, the congregation burned the mortgage on the old parsonage.  The Mary and Martha Society was formed…"

The First Christian Reformed Church Waupun, WI church bulletin The Mary and Martha Society has existed since 1934 as a Ladies Bible Study Society. A freewill offering is taken to support church improvements.

The First Reformed Church Mary & Martha Society, a group color picture
The Mary and Martha Society has existed since 1934 as a Ladies Bible Study Society.

Fortin, R., Faith and Action, A History of the Catholic Archdiocese of Cincinnati, 1821–1996 Oct 2002 "To help support the charitable causes members of St Peters, St Joseph's and St Aloysius male and female orphan society paid 25 cents per month to support charitable causes.  Those of the M&M, a charitable organization established in 1836 for the benefit of the poor the sick and the elderly paid 12 cents per month." pg 126.

Kessler, C. The Mary and Martha News reported in the church bulletin for October, 2008.

Lake Street Church Evanston, IL From their website How We Serve "The marthas are an eclectic group of volunteers inspired by Luke 10: 39-42.  Choosing to interpret the Scripture that the acts of labor are as important as hearing the Word, the marthas volunteer one Saturday per month fixing what needs fixing around this 150 year old structure."

Lynkirk Church of Christ Austintown Ohio email correspondence with the webmaster telling me that the Mary and Martha Society closed because the elderly members could not keep the church going.

Mary and Martha Society of St. Mary’s Episcopal Church Albuquerque, NM Church bulletin The Mary and Martha Society was established in the summer of 2005 to raise money for St. Mary's Outreach Programs, to promote fellowship among the ladies of St. Mary's, and to have fun.

Mary and Martha Society, Union Congregational Church 1907 Richmond Hill, NY.

McCann, M.A., The history of Mother Seton's daughters: the Sisters of Charity of Cincinnati, Ohio, Volume 2 pub New York Longmans Green 1917-23
February 25, 1853 Sr. Angela McKay took charge of the Society In July Rev Charles Driscoll SJ spoke to the group about the mystical number seven from page 303 & 304.

Monroe County Independent, Monroe County Illinois An obituary for Wanda Faye Buckman nee Bledsoe, died April 10, 2008, in Waterloo. She was born Oct. 25, 1935 and was a member of the Mary and Martha Society.

Mueller, D. a personal letter on behalf of Brook Highland Community Church August 12, 2009

New York Times obituary August 29, 1909 Mrs. Emma Clayton Hudson a member of the Mary and Martha Society.

O’Fallon Evangelical and Reformed Church O’Fallon, IL   A 1954 centennial program listing the creation of The Mary and Martha Society as January 24, 1907.

Paterson, D. Old Mill Graveyard now Old Mill Cemetery, Upson County Georgia September 3, 1996 from archives
"An asterisk (*) in the last column indicates that the marker is inscribed with the name or initials of the Sons & Daughters of Mary & Martha Society. The Daughters of Mary and Martha Society was a mutual-aid society started by the ladies of St. Mary AME Church in the 1880s. It was primarily to provide funds for decent burial for members - hence the tombstone inscriptions. The society was later expanded to include men, so became the Sons and Daughters of Mary & Martha Society. It later opened membership to persons outside the AME church, and expanded its charitable missions. Today, it owns and operates several houses in Thomaston that it rents to low-income persons, and runs a youth program."

Peoria Journal Star, Obituary November 11, 1996 Mary A. Cardinal A member of the Mary and Martha Society.

Peoria Journal Star, Obituary August 29, 2003 Mary R. DelFavero A member of the Mary and Martha Society of Holy Family Catholic Church of Peoria, IL.

Peace Lutheran Church Vancouver, CN Their church news discussed the Grandmother to Grandmother Campaign and the Mary and Martha Society.

Sisters of Charity of Cincinnati, Ohio "In February, 1853, the sisters took charge of the Mary and Martha Society, a charitable organization established for the benefit of the poor of the city."

SS. Peter and Paul Church, Waterloo, IL The constitution of the Mary and Martha Society.

St. Louis, MO Mary and Martha Society 1938, The Queen Cooks, Sugar and Spice and everything nice
"This Little Compilation of the Mary and Martha Sodality of Saint Mary Magdalene's Parish in Saint Louis is dedicated in Humble and devoted service."

St Mary's Episcopal Church Albuquerque NM Church bulletin
The Mary and Martha Society established in the summer of 2005 to raise money for St. Mary's Outreach Programs, to promote fellowship among the ladies of St. Mary's, and to have fun.

Tindall, G. B., South Carolina Negroes 1877–1900
Page 284 notes that the Society were present in the Charleston Negro community.

References

Christian charities based in the United States
Religious organizations established in 1836
Catholic charities